Tai Po Kau, also signed simply as Tai Po, was a railway station on the British section of the Kowloon–Canton Railway in Tai Po Kau, New Territories, Hong Kong. Its location next to Tai Po Hoi and a pier serving the northeast New Territories made Tai Po Kau a transport hub.

The station had traditional Chinese architecture.

As roads and public transport were improved in the area and as the remote villages depopulated, the importance of the station and the pier declined quickly. The station was abandoned when the railway was electrified in the early 1980s. At this time, two ferry routes serving the adjacent pier (to Tap Mun and Tung Ping Chau) were moved to the Ma Liu Shui Pier near University station.

In the 1990s, the station structure was removed and replaced with staff quarters of the KCR Corporation. This development is called "Trackside Villas" and is linked to Tai Po Market station by a shuttle bus.

References

Former Kowloon–Canton Railway stations
Defunct railway stations in Hong Kong
Tai Po
Railway stations in Hong Kong opened in 1910
Railway stations closed in 1983
1910 establishments in Hong Kong
1983 disestablishments in Hong Kong